The ninth season of the television series Dallas aired on CBS during the 1985–86 TV season. As the entire season was annulled as a dream of the character Pamela Barnes Ewing (Victoria Principal) in the season 10 premiere, it has since been referred to as the "Dream Year" or the "Dream Season".

Cast

Starring
In alphabetical order:
 Barbara Bel Geddes as Miss Ellie Ewing Farlow (31 episodes)
 Linda Gray as Sue Ellen Ewing (31 episodes)
 Larry Hagman as J.R. Ewing (31 episodes)
 Susan Howard as Donna Culver Krebbs (31 episodes)
 Steve Kanaly as Ray Krebbs (31 episodes)
 Howard Keel as Clayton Farlow (28 episodes)
 Ken Kercheval as Cliff Barnes (31 episodes)
 Priscilla Beaulieu Presley as Jenna Wade (29 episodes)
 Victoria Principal as Pamela Barnes Ewing (30 episodes)

Also Starring
 Jenilee Harrison as Jamie Ewing Barnes (30 episodes)
 Dack Rambo as Jack Ewing (31 episodes)
 John Beck as Mark Graison (28 episodes), billed under "Guest Star" status for his first appearance
 Deborah Shelton as Mandy Winger (21 episodes)
 Marc Singer as Matt Cantrell (12 episodes)
 Jared Martin as Steven "Dusty" Farlow (11 episodes)
 Steve Forrest as Ben Stivers (3 episodes)

Special Guest Stars
 Barbara Carrera as Angelica Nero (25 episodes)
 Martha Scott as Patricia Shepard (7 episodes)
 William Prince as Alex Garrett (5 episodes)
 Ted Shackelford as Gary Ewing (1 episode)
 Patrick Duffy as Bobby Ewing  (1 episode)

Notable guest stars
William Smithers (Jeremy Wendell) continues to appear, and Joshua Harris takes on the role as Christopher Ewing. Merete Van Kamp (Grace) and George Chakiris (Nicholas) appear in a major story arc, as does Solomon Smaniotto (Tony Krebbs), but none of them will return beyond the season.

Crew 
After years of only minor changes in the creative staff of the series, the ninth season sees several overhauls: while Philip Capice and Cliff Fenneman remain executive producer and associate producer respectively, James H. Brown replaces Leonard Katzman as producer, who is now the program's creative consultant. Peter Dunne as supervising producer replaces Katzman as showrunner, while Joel J. Feigenbaum as executive story consultant replaces David Paulsen, and Hollace White and Stephanie Garman join as story editors.

Among the three main writers for the two previous seasons, only Leonard Katzman returns for season nine. Other writers for the season are Peter Dunne (who had written two season eight episodes), Will Lorin (who had worked on the show during seasons five and six), and newcomers Joel J. Feigenbaum, Hollace White, Stephanie Garmin, Deanne Barkley, Bill Taub, and series star Susan Howard (Donna).

DVD release
Season nine of Dallas''' was released by Warner Bros. Home Video, on a Region 1 DVD box set of four double-sided DVDs, on July 15, 2008. In addition to the 31 episodes, it also includes the featurette "Seasons of Change".

Dallas: The Early Years

On March 23, 1986, between the 26th and the 27th episode of the season, CBS aired the three-hour-long telefilm prequel Dallas: The Early Years, the only Dallas'' movie made during the series' original run. Written by series creator David Jacobs, the film was introduced by Larry Hagman as his character J.R., and starred David Marshall Grant, Dale Midkiff, and Molly Hagan as Digger Barnes, Jock Ewing, and Ellie Southworth, respectively. Taking place from 1933 to 1951, the film dealt with the creation of Ewing Oil and the origins of the Barnes – Ewing feud.

Episodes

References

General references

External links 

1985 American television seasons
1986 American television seasons
Dallas (1978 TV series) seasons